This is the list of episodes for the Nickelodeon promotion, Wrestling Association of Championship Krushers.

Web Videos
When the WACK website launched, two sets of web-only videos were included in each wrestler's profile. They were called "Behind the WACK" and "Signature Moves Videos". However, the "Signature Moves" videos have never been released.

Behind the WACK
"Behind the WACK" videos contain each wrestler's history, how they joined the league, and a few minor facts about them. They are around two minutes long.

Signature Moves
Along with the "Behind the WACK" videos, the profiles on the WACK website also come with signature moves videos. Although they haven't been released on the website, they were filmed at the same time as the "Behind-the-WACK" videos and why they were not released is unknown.

Episodes

Lists of comedy television series episodes